BPB Ltd (formerly BPB plc) (British Plaster Board) was a British building materials business. It once was a constituent of the FTSE 100 Index.  In 2005, the company was purchased by Saint-Gobain of France. The company's subsidiary British Gypsum, which was the UK operating arm of the company, operates as a subsidiary of Saint-Gobain, with five manufacturing sites in Britain as of 2012.

History

Inter-war period
The development of plasterboard (a sandwich of gypsum plaster between two sheets of paper) dates back to the late nineteenth century in the US. The first patent was granted in 1894 but it was not until an American, Frank Culver, persuaded his new employer, Thomas McGhie and Sons, to buy a plasterboard plant from the US that this new product was introduced to Britain. A site was acquired at Wallasey Cheshire and building started in 1916. However, McGhie's shareholders could not supply sufficient funding and in 1917 the plasterboard assets were sold to a new company, British Plaster Board Limited [BPB].

The British building industry was initially slow to adopt the new product.  Helped by a more modern plant, purchased in 1927, sales gradually increased and by 1932 the Company was able to float on the London Stock Exchange. The additional capital enabled BPB to build a new factory at Erith in 1934. The Erith plant had the capacity to manufacture the gypsum plaster (the core of the plasterboard product) and BPB began importing gypsum rock from Canada. This encouraged negotiations with other gypsum companies in Britain and a "breath-taking series of take-overs" followed in the next two years, making BPB the dominant force in the industry. In particular, these included the Gotham Company with plaster works in the north of England, and The Gypsum Mines Limited, with its large gypsum mine at Mountfield Sussex.

Early post-war history
In 1944, BPB acquired its large rival, Gyproc Products Limited; after that there were only a handful of small companies and when ICI withdrew from the market in 1968 BPB was the only British producer of plaster and plasterboard. Organisationally, all domestic gypsum activities were consolidated in the British Gypsum subsidiary and the parent company was BPB Industries.  BPB had also acquired the main paper supplier in 1953 – the Aberdeen firm of C. Davidson.

The post-war period saw extensive overseas investment through subsidiaries and associates. South Africa was the first investment (1946) followed by Placoplatre in France (1952), Western Gypsum of Canada (1954) and Sweden (1957).

Recent history
In 1987 it bought Rigips, a well-known brand in Austria, Germany, Italy and the Netherlands.

In April 1996, it bought Borgadts of Germany for £21m. In June 1996, it bought Gypsum Industries of South Africa for £28m. In October 1998, it bought Gyproc of Scandinavia for £95m, already having a joint venture called Scancem. In March 2000 it bought Heidelberger Dammsysteme of Germany, which made polystyrene insulation, for £22m. In June 2000, it acquired the Celotex company of the US, which made ceiling tiles, for £230m. In January 2001, it bought Rawlplug Ltd. for £27m. In October 2002, it acquired Gyproc Benelux of Belgium for £52m.

In March 2002 it acquired James Hardie Industries, another US business, for £245 million.

Takeover
BPB regained its place in the FTSE 100 Index in June 2005 after an absence of 14 years.

However, since May 1996, BPB had a joint venture with the French company Saint-Gobain, making glass fibre insulation. In August 2005, BPB received a hostile takeover bid from Saint-Gobain, which set a price of 720 pence per share.

The BPB initially resisted this strongly, but eventually accepted a revised bid of 775 pence per share, which valued the company at £3.9billion (US$6.7 billion). BPB was delisted in December 2005.

Operations
BPB was a multinational company with operations in Europe, the Middle East, Africa and Asia. In Europe its main rivals are Lafarge of France and Knauf of Germany, which has a UK plant at Immingham.

Plasterboard is mainly used for internal partition walls. BPB's other products include plaster, insulating materials, fastenings, decorative wall covering and ceiling components. British Gypsum has plants at Barrow upon Soar in Leicestershire, Kirkby Thore in Cumbria, Mountfield near Robertsbridge in East Sussex, Sherburn-in-Elmet in North Yorkshire and East Leake in Nottinghamshire. It also has training facilities in Erith, south-east London, Clevedon, North Somerset, and Flitwick, in Bedfordshire.

References

External links
 Official site
 British Gypsum
 Parent Company

News items
 BPB accepts French bid in November 2005
 Hostile bid in August 2005
 Fined in November 2002

Building materials companies of the United Kingdom
Companies based in Nottinghamshire
Manufacturing companies established in 1915
Companies formerly listed on the London Stock Exchange
Manufacturing companies of the United Kingdom
Rushcliffe
Saint-Gobain
1915 establishments in England
2005 mergers and acquisitions
British subsidiaries of foreign companies